Sidney Gordon may refer to:

Sidney Gordon (businessman) (1917–2007), Scottish businessman
Sid Gordon (1917–1975), American baseball player

See also
Bernard Sidney Gordon (1891–1963), Australian Army soldier and recipient of the Victoria Cross